Balin is a fictional character in J. R. R. Tolkien's world of Middle-earth. A Dwarf, he is an important supporting character in The Hobbit, and is mentioned in The Fellowship of the Ring. As the Fellowship travel through the underground realm of Moria, they find Balin's tomb and the Dwarves' book of records, which tells how Balin founded a colony there, becoming Lord of Moria, and that the colony was overrun by orcs.

Balin featured in the 1977 Rankin/Bass animated film of The Hobbit; in Peter Jackson's 2012–2014 live-action film series, where he is portrayed by Ken Stott as reluctant to search for lost gold and sympathetic to Bilbo; and in the 2003 video game adaptation where he is voiced by Victor Raider-Wexler.

Literature

Early life

Balin was born in Erebor, the son of Fundin. In the year Balin turned seven, Erebor was sacked by the dragon Smaug, and the Dwarves went into exile. During that period his younger brother Dwalin was born. Their father Fundin was killed in the Battle of Azanulbizar. Balin and his brother settled in the Blue Mountains with their surviving family. Balin and Dwalin were among those who set out with Thorin's father Thráin II in an attempt to return to Erebor, but they lost Thráin under the eaves of Mirkwood. After many days of fruitless searching, they returned to the Blue Mountains.

The Hobbit

Balin was a member of Thorin Oakenshield's company of Dwarves who travelled with Bilbo Baggins and Gandalf in the Quest of Erebor, on which the plot of The Hobbit centres. His brother Dwalin and he were the first to arrive at Bilbo's house at the beginning of The Hobbit. He played a viol. He was among those who had been at the Mountain before the dragon came. He had been 7 years old while Thorin had been 24 on that day, making him the second-eldest of the Dwarves in the company.

Tolkien describes Balin as "their look-out man": he spotted Bilbo approaching the Green Dragon Inn at Bywater, saw the trolls' fire in the Trollshaws, and was the first to see the elves in Mirkwood. After they escaped the goblins in the Misty Mountains, Balin as look-out for the company failed to notice Bilbo (made invisible by wearing his magic ring), and after this incident he came to respect Bilbo's abilities as a burglar. Balin served as the de facto spokesman for the party after the Elvenking imprisoned the Dwarves, as they did not at first realise that Thorin had been captured with them as well.

In the course of the Quest, Balin was the Dwarf who developed the closest friendship with Bilbo. He was the only one who offered to look for Bilbo after he had gone down the secret Erebor passage. Some years after the Quest, he and Gandalf visited Bilbo at Bag End, where Balin told of the mountain's glory restored in the years after the Battle of the Five Armies.

The Lord of the Rings

In The Fellowship of the Ring, one of the Dwarves of Thorin's company, Glóin tells the Council of Elrond that Balin had left Erebor and ventured to reclaim Moria with a company of Dwarves including Óin and Ori (two of his companions from the Quest of Erebor), and Flói, Frár, Lóni, and Náli. The fate of Balin's colony was uncertain, as no word had come from Moria in many years. The Fellowship (which included Balin's cousin, Glóin's son Gimli) later happened upon Balin's tomb in the Chamber of Mazarbul, and learnt of his fate from the Dwarves' book of records, the Book of Mazarbul. It told how Balin discovered Durin's Axe, and established a small colony, but it was overrun by orcs and Balin was killed by an orc archer in Dimrill Dale. Thus he died in the same place as his father, having been self-proclaimed Lord of Moria for less than five years. Balin's tomb was inscribed "Balin Fundinul Uzbad Khazad-Dûmu", with smaller runes beneath giving the translation into English (as the representation of Tolkien’s invented language of Westron): "Balin, son of Fundin, Lord of Moria".

Analysis

The Tolkien scholar John D. Rateliff writes that Balin is the only Dwarf of Thorin's company whose name does not come directly from the Old Norse poem Völuspá, part of the Poetic Edda. The name appears in Sir Thomas Malory's Middle English prose tale Le Morte d'Arthur, but in Rateliff's view Sir Balin is not nearly as likeable a character.

The Tolkien scholar Tom Shippey notes that in the final scene of The Hobbit, Balin, Bilbo, and Gandalf discuss the connection between prophecy, individual action, and truth. Balin states that the new master of Dale is wise and popular, and the people "are making songs which say that in his day the rivers run with gold." They agree that "after a fashion", the metaphors can indeed be true, that in Shippey's words "romance and reality are differences of presentation not of fact".

When Balin leaves, disastrously, to seek his fortune in Moria, "a shadow of disquiet" came over the Dwarves, as Glóin reports to the Council of Elrond. Shippey writes that the metaphor of the shadow is ominous, and ambiguous: it could mean simple earthly discontent, or it could mean a spell from Mordor: "maybe Balin simultaneously fell [made his own choice] and was pushed [bewitched]."

Tolkien expended enormous effort on constructing a facsimile Book of Mazarbul to resemble the burnt, torn volume abandoned at Balin's tomb, carefully staining and tearing the paper and burning in the burn-marks to make it as authentic as possible. However, his publisher Allen & Unwin chose not to include his artwork in the first edition, prompting Tolkien to remark that without it the text at the start of "The Bridge of Khazad-Dûm" was "rather absurd".

Adaptations

Don Messick voiced Balin in Rankin/Bass's 1977 animated version of The Hobbit.

In Jackson's live-action film series of The Hobbit, Balin is portrayed by Ken Stott as reluctant to go on the quest for old gold, whether or not the dragon had stolen it from Balin's ancestors. As such, he is sympathetic to Bilbo, who appears quite unsuitable for the task he is being given.

In the 2003 video game adaptation Balin is voiced by Victor Raider-Wexler.

Family tree

Notes

References

Primary
This list identifies each item's location in Tolkien's writings.

Secondary

Sources 

 
 
 
 

Middle-earth Dwarves
Characters in The Hobbit
Middle-earth rulers
Literary characters introduced in 1937

pt:Anexo:Lista de anões da Terra-média#Balin